A solar fan is a mechanical fan powered by solar panels. The solar panels are either mounted on the device or are installed independently. Solar fans mostly do not require secondary power sources other than solar power, as most of them are used for cooling purposes during day time. Some types are also used for heating purposes. It runs the fastest when it is the hottest outside providing savings on air conditioning costs.

How is it used? 
Attic heat is caused by the sun baking down on the roof surface. This sunlight causes the roofing material to heat up, thus transferring the heat into the attic via thermal transfer. The buildup of heat is generally dissipated by normal convection, i.e.: as the air is heated it expands and rises, flowing out of the attic through vents placed at or near the peak, while fresh air is pulled into the attic from intake vents that are generally in the eave (soffit) area. However, most roof vents are inadequate at expelling the heat and require the use of a powered vent fan to remove heat effectively. A solar powered attic fan is an effective way to remove attic heat using only the power of the sun to run the fan.

Solar-powered attic fan - roof mounted 
A roof-mounted solar attic fan can be effective in removing excessive heat from the attic. When mounted near the peak the solar fan forces hot air out while pulling fresh air in via eave/soffit vents. This exchange of air keeps the attic space from overheating. Solar attic fans not only lower the cooling costs in your home, they also extend the life of your shingle roof.

Solar-powered attic fan - gable mounted 
It is similar to the roof mounted solar fan, except that its installation is a little different. Most attic fans are installed on the roof surface, whereas gable fans are installed in the gables, inside the attic and behind an existing louvered gable vent as the name suggests. They are mostly installed in places like  greenhouse, cabin, RV's garages or barns and other storage places where heat and moisture are usually present. These types of fans are generally installed behind  intake grills to provide ventilation. Gable Solar Fans are usually installed high on the gable close to the ridge and are also coupled with soffit or roof vents for well-balanced intake and exhaust air avenues. The airflow depends upon the level of sunlight when there is more sunlight, the airflow will be more resulting in enhanced cooling. It is also capable of lowering the air conditioning costs by cooling the attic.

Since the only source of energy is from the solar panel for a solar fan. It is important to have a larger solar panel to get the better performance from the solar fan. Amtrak Solar makes one of the most powerful solar fans in United States of America. 

In 2007, solar fans were installed on the terminal roofs of Honolulu International Airport, in addition to the mansion of Indiana governor. In 2009 the Indiana State Senate passed a bill giving a tax deduction to homeowners with solar fans.

Advantages 
 A solar fan is more environmentally friendly and reduces your carbon emission.
 Though initially the installation may be costlier, in the long term it would turn out to be cheaper because it does not use power from the utility grid and may provide savings up to 30 percent on air conditioning costs.
 Risk of electric accidents are eliminated as there are no electric cords attached to the solar fan.
 A cordless appliance offers much more mobility compared to conventional fans.

See also 

 List of solar powered products
 Solar cell phone charger
 Solar notebook
 Solar powered calculator
 Solar powered watch
 Solar powered radio
 Solar powered flashlight
 Solar powered fountain
 Solar street light

References 

Solar-powered devices
Ventilation fans
Cooling technology
Ventilation
Heating, ventilation, and air conditioning
Applications of photovoltaics